Hotel St. Pauli is a 1988 Norwegian drama film by Svend Wam, based upon the novel Jord! by Erland Kiøsterud.

The movie is set in Copenhagen, Hamburg and the roads in between. It is about sex and violence in the Hamburg red light district of St. Pauli.

Plot
Jor tries to make a living as an artist. For the time being, he and his girlfriend Gerda have to live off her income as a prostitute. When the young Morgan comes into their life, the relationship between the three becomes difficult, with Gerda and Morgan eventually fleeing.

Cast 
 Øyvin Bang Berven as Morgan 
 John Ege as Jor 
 Amanda Ooms as Gerda 
 Sossen Krohg as Morgan's mother
 Jöns Andersson as Priest
 Jorunn Kjellsby as theatre manager
 Lasse Lindtner as Jor on stage 
 Petter Nome as radio voice
 Linn Stokke as Gerda on stage
 Ingrid van Bergen as hotel manager

Production
When it came out, this film caused a debate due to its unsimulated sex scenes. Amanda Ooms said she didn't regret to have played in this movie: "No not at all. I did my job well there, but there are scene in which I had full sex and some other strange things. It's a movie on the border. It's a pretty sex-based movie. It is a little difficult to explain to my own children why I took that role. I guess I did it just because I got paid well," she said.

References

External links

1988 films
1988 drama films
Films directed by Svend Wam
Films set in West Germany
Films set in Hamburg
Films shot in Hamburg
Films set in Copenhagen
Films shot in Norway
Norwegian drama films
Erotic drama films